Grooves in the Temple (released 2005) is an album by Brazilian bassist Jorge Pescara.

Track listing
 "Comin Home Baby" – 4:40
 "Laura Lee" – 5:15
 "Miles-Miller" – 6:11
 "Kashmir" – 7:51
 "Grooves in the Temple" – 5:34
 "The Great Emperor of the Bass" – 4:41
 "Power of Soul" – 7:03
 "Funchal" – 6:49
 "Sofisticada" – 3:55
 "Meteor" – 3:54
 "Black Widow" – 4:47
 "Power of Soul VOCAL VERSION" – 4:48
 "Kashmir VOCAL VERSION" – 5:22

Personnel
Dom Um Romão  – drums
Ithamara Koorax  – vocals
Luiz Bonfá  – classical guitar
Cláudio Zoli  – guitar, soloist
Eumir Deodato  – Fender Rhodes, backing vocals
Laudir de Oliveira  – percussion
João Paulo Mendonça  – organ, Fender Rhodes, synthesizer, Mellotron, flute
Paula Faour – Minimoog, soloist
Alfredo Dias Gomes – drums
Sidinho Moreira – percussion
José Carlos Ramos – tenor and soprano saxophone, soloist
Widor Santiago – baritone saxophone, soloist
Cláudio Infente – drums
Guilherme Isnard – vocals
Sérgio Vid – vocals
Jorge Pescara – electric bass, arranger, fretless bass, keyboards, backing vocals, executive producer, upright electric bass, E-bow, Chapman Stick
Glauton Campello – keyboards, synthesizer Matrix Xpander, XP500, Fender Rhodes
Nick Remo – drums
Guto Goffi – drums
Maurício Barros – Hammond organ with Leslie
Manny Monteiro - drums
Sérgio Nacif - drums
João Palma - drums
Cláudio Kote - guitar
Dudu Caribé - guitar, soloist
Roberto Marques - trombone
Dino Rangel - guitar, soloist
Mila Schiavo - percussion
Akira Akurai - taiko
Ricardo Brasil - percussion
Vander Nascimento - flugelhorn, soloist
Jefferson Nery - oboe
Diógenes de Souza - French horn
Sérgio Malafaia - bassoon
André Gomes - sitar

Production
Arnaldo DeSouteiro – Producer, Mixing	
João Moreira – Engineer, Mixing	
Fábio Golfetti – Art Direction, Design	
Jorge Pescara – Executive Producer, Mixing	
Pete Turner – Photography	
Gustavo Victorino – Photography	
Lula Lavour – Engineer, Assistant Engineer
Cury Heluy - Technical Supervisor	
Luis Fernando Grillo – Engineer	
Alfredo Dias Gomes – Engineer	
Douglas Payne – Liner Notes	
Geraldo Brandão – Mastering	
Victor Dias – Engineer

2005 albums